B2D may refer to:

Business-to-developer
Business-to-dealer; see business-to-business
Bipolar II disorder
Backup-to-disk
Born to Die, 2012 album by Lana Del Rey